Zach Eldridge (born May 31, 1984) is a Canadian curler from Nackawic, New Brunswick.

Career
Eldridge lost the final of the 2013 Molson Canadian Men's Provincial Curling Championship to James Grattan by a narrow score of 7–6. He did get to go to the 2013 Tim Hortons Brier with the team though as their alternate. There, New Brunswick they went 5–6. Eldridge didn't play in any games.

He joined the Jeremy Mallais rink for the 2014–15 season and it paid off as the team won the 2015 Pepsi Tankard. At the 2015 Tim Hortons Brier in Calgary, they finished 2–9.

Personal life
Eldridge works as a realtor at REMAX East Coast Elite Reality.

Teams

References

External links

Curlers from New Brunswick
Living people
People from York County, New Brunswick
1984 births
Canadian male curlers
21st-century Canadian people